Phyloscan is a web service for DNA sequence analysis that is free and open to all users (without login requirement).  For locating matches to a user-specified sequence motif for a regulatory binding site, Phyloscan provides a statistically sensitive scan of user-supplied mixed aligned and unaligned DNA sequence data.  Phyloscan's strength is that it brings together 
 the Staden method for computing statistical significance,
 the "phylogenetic motif model" scanning functionality of the MONKEY software that models evolutionary relationships among aligned sequences,
 the use of the Bailey & Gribskov method for combining statistics across non-aligned sequence data, and
 the Neuwald & Green technique for combining statistics across multiple binding sites found within a single gene promoter region.

References

External links
Phyloscan homepage at Brown University

Bioinformatics
Bioinformatics software
Computational science